Love Marriage is a 1984 family-drama Indian Hindi film directed by Mehul Kumar and produced by Kadar Kashmiri, Jagdish C. Sharma and Ibrahim Surti. It starred Anil Kapoor, Meenakshi Sheshadri, Utpal Dutt and Mehmood in lead roles. Music for the film was scored by Anu Malik. which is super hit

Plot
Rajesh Mehra lives a wealthy lifestyle with his mom, Sarita, and dad. His dad finalizes his marriage with Malti, who is the daughter of equally wealthy, Jagdish Kapoor. When Rajesh is told, he refuses to marry Malti as she is mentally unstable, an argument ensues, and Rajesh angrily leaves. He befriends a poultry farmer, Majid Kaliya, and lives rent-free in a room in his house. Rajesh takes to singing in a nightclub, meets with wealthy Ritu Mafatlal and both fall in love with each other. Mafatlal wants a rich groom for Ritu, and refuses to permit them to marry, so both elope, get married, and Malti moves in with Rajesh in Majid's room. This does not auger well with Majid's wife, Shabnam, who refuses to permit both to sleep together. Understanding their frustration, Majid gives them two passes to Mysore where they can spend time with each other - the only problem is that the passes are in the names of Kaushal and his sister Kamini Tiwari. Watch what happens when the duo end up at the Srivastav household, run by the Hitler-like Jailor, who had been fired from his job for letting Veeru and Jai (of Sholay) escape from his penitentiary, and are wooed by Murari and Leela Srivastav. Chaos ensues when Kaushal and Kamini decide to make a run with the jailer, and an odd assortment of characters - ranging from goons to black marketeers, giving chase to the hapless honeymooning couple

Cast
Mehmood Ali    	...	Majid Kaliya
Asrani             ...	T.T. Murari Srivastav / Jailor
Master Bhagwan	...	Bhang drinker (as Bhagwan Dada)
C.S. Dubey	        ...	Chaubey
Utpal Dutt	        ...	Shankar Singh
Dinesh Hingoo	...	Ramarao Raghvendrarao Basu Chatterjee 'Vasu' Gundappa
Aruna Irani	...	Leela 'Laila' Srivastav
Jagdeep            ...	Dudhwala
Arvind Joshi	...	Jagdish Kapoor
Anil Kapoor	...	Rajesh Mehra / Kaushal Tiwari
Satyendra Kapoor	...	'Monty' Mafatlal
Kanan Kaushal	...	Sarita Mehra
Raj Kishore	...	Fernandes
Shehnaz Kudia	...	Shabnam 'Shabu' M. Kaliya
Anoop Kumar	...	Chaurangi
Shreeram Lagoo	...	Mehra
Meenakshi Sheshadri...	Ritu Mafatlal

Soundtrack
"O Neeli Chhatri Wale Meri Bhi Araj Ye Sun Le" - Shabbir Kumar, Anuradha Paudwal
"Apna Jeevan Rail Ki Patri, Sath Rahe Or MilNa Paaye" - Anuradha Paudwal, Shabbir Kumar
"Beeswin Sadi Ke" - Alka Yagnik, Amit Kumar
"Murgi Wala Apni Murgian" - Kishore Kumar
"Tujhsa Hasin Dekha Nahi, Ee Abba Dabba Dibbi Da" - Vijay Benedict

References

External links 
 

Films scored by Anu Malik
1980s Hindi-language films
Indian drama films
Films directed by Mehul Kumar
1984 drama films
1984 films
Hindi-language drama films